Christiaan is a Dutch, Flemish and Afrikaans male given name. An archaic spelling of the name was Christiaen with "ae" to indicate the long sound "a". People with the name include:

Notable given name as Christiaan 
Christiaan van Adrichem (1533–1585), Dutch Catholic priest and theological writer
Christiaan Andriessen (1775–1846), Dutch painter
Christiaan Bailey (born 1981), American surfer
Christiaan Bakkes (born 1965), South African  writer
Christiaan Bangeman Huygens (1772–1857), Dutch diplomat and civil servant
Christiaan Barnard (1922–2001), South African cardiac surgeon known for his heart transplants
Christiaan Basson (born 1982), South African golfer
Christiaan Berger (1911–1965), Dutch sprinter
Christiaan Beyers (1869–1914), South African Boer general during the Second Boer War
Christiaan Bezuidenhout (born 1994), South African golfer
Christiaan Frederick Beyers Naudé (1915–2004), South African cleric, theologian, and anti-apartheid activist
Christiaen Jansz van Bieselingen (1558–1600), Dutch genre and portrait painter
Christiaan Boers (1889–1942), Dutch Royal Netherlands Army captain during World War II
Christiaan Both (1895–1977), Dutch sport shooter
Christiaan Both (ecologist) (born 1969), Dutch ecologist
Christiaan Brosch (1878–1969), Dutch sport shooter
Christiaan Bruil (born 1970), Dutch badminton player
Christiaan Brunings (1736–1805), Dutch hydraulic engineer
Christiaan Cicek (born 1988), Dutch football striker
Christiaan Coevershoff (1595–1659), Dutch painter
Christiaan Cornelissen (1864–1942), Dutch syndicalist writer, economist, and trade unionist
Christiaen van Couwenbergh (1604–1667), Dutch historical/allegorical painter
Christiaan de Bruin (born 1990), South African rugby player
Christiaan de Wet (1854–1922), South African Boer general, rebel leader and politician
Christiaan De Wilde (born 1960s), Belgian businessman
Christiaan du Toit (1901–1982), South African military commander
Christiaan Eijkman (1858–1930), Dutch physician, physiologist and Nobel Prize laureate
Christiaan Justus Enschedé (1788–1829), Dutch newspaper editor and printer
Christiaan Freeling (born 1947), Dutch game designer and inventor of abstract strategy games
Christiaan Willem Fokma (1927–2012), Dutch sculptor and ceramist
Christiaan van der Goes (1530s–1600), Dutch nobleman,  schout of Delft
Christiaan Groepe (1789–1886), Khoi military leader in the Cape Colony
Christiaan Harmse (born 1973), South African hammer thrower
Christiaan Heij (born 1950s), Dutch mathematician
Christiaan Hendrik Muller (1865–1945), South African Boer War general
Christiaan Huijgens (1897–1963), Dutch long-distance runner
Christiaan Huygens (1629–1695), Dutch physicist, mathematician, astronomer and inventor
Christiaan Jonker (born 1986), South African cricketer
Christiaan Josi (1768–1828), Dutch engraver and art dealer
Christiaan Kok (born 1971), Zimbabwean cricketer
Christiaan Kriens (1881–1934), Belgian-born American composer, pianist, violinist and conductor
Christiaan Emil Marie Küpper (1883–1931), Dutch artist, founder of De Stijl, better known as "Theo van Doesburg"
Christiaan Kuyvenhoven (born 1985), Dutch pianist
Christiaan Lans (1789–1843), Dutch colonial head of the Dutch Gold Coast 1834-36
Christiaan Frederik Louis Leipoldt (1880–1947), South African poet, dramatist, medical doctor, reporter and food expert
Christiaan van Lennep (1887–1955), Dutch tennis player
Christiaan Lindemans (1912–1946), Dutch double agent during the Second World War
Christiaan Luyckx (1623–c.1675), Flemish still life painter
Christiaan Meyer (born 1994), South African rugby player
Christiaan Moltzer (1875–1945), Dutch sport shooter
Christiaan Monden (born 1975), Dutch sociologist
Christiaan Müller (1690–1763), German-born Dutch organ builder
Christiaan Nagel (born 1982), South African-born British street artist
Christiaan Neumeier (1921–1991), Dutch rower
Christiaan Benjamin Nieuwenhuis (1863–1922), Dutch photographer in the Dutch East Indies
Christiaan Offringa (fl.2001–2005), Dutch curler
Christiaan Hendrik Persoon (1761–1836), Dutch mycologist 
Christiaan Pförtner (born 1966), German football midfielder
Christiaan van Pol (1752–1813), Dutch flower painter
Christiaan Roets (born 1980), South African-born Welsh rugby player
Christiaan Scholtz (born 1970), South African rugby player
Christiaan Sepp (c.1710–1775), German-born Dutch entomologist and artist
Christiaan Slieker (1861–1945), Dutch early film exhibitor
Christiaan Snouck Hurgronje (1857–1936), Dutch scholar of Oriental cultures and languages
Christiaan Snyman (born 1996), Namibian cricketer
Christiaan Steyn (1897–?), South African sprinter
Christiaen Striep (1634–1673), Dutch still-life painter
Christiaan Timmermans (born 1941), Dutch law professor and judge.
Christiaan Tonnet (1902–1946), Dutch equestrian and modern pentathlete
Christiaan Tonnis (born 1956), German symbolist/realist painter, draftsman, and video artist
Christiaan Maurits van den Heever (1902–1957), Afrikaans  novelist, poet, essayist, and biographer
Christiaan Van Vuuren (born 1982), Australian actor and video blogger
Christiaan Varenhorst (born 1990), Dutch beach volleyball player
Christiaan van Velzen (born 1932), Dutch sport shooter
Christiaen van Vianen (1598–1671), Dutch silversmith and draughtsman
Christiaan Viljoen (born 1961), South African tennis player

Dutch masculine given names